The Albanian Rapid Reaction Brigade was created on 6 January 2001. It is the core unit of the Albanian Land Forces. In January 2003 there was the first structural reorganization and since November 2006 we have the current organization. It is considered a first priority unit of the Albanian Armed Forces.

Mission
The Brigade carries out offensive and defensive operations, Peace Support Operations and humanitarian assistance.

Equipment
 TT pistol
 Makarov pistol
 Heckler & Koch MP5
 AK-47
 Type 54 HMG
 RPD machine gun
 Dragunov sniper rifle
 60 mm mortar
 81 mm mortar
 120 mm mortar
 Type 66 152 mm towed gun-howitzer
 RPG-7

Peacetime Structure
The Rapid Reaction Brigade has its Command and HQ, 3 Infantry battalions, 1 Logistic Battalion, 1 Artillery Battalion, 1 Engineer Battalion, and 4 Subordinate Companies（Reconnaissance, NBC Protection, Signal, Military Police.

See also
 Albanian Air Force
 Albanian Naval Defense Forces

Military units and formations of Albania